The Governor of Metro Manila was a political position whose holder served as the executive head of the National Capital Region (NCR) of the Philippines, also known as Metro Manila. The position during its existence was also known as the Governor of the Metro Manila Commission. The Metro Manila Commission was the central government of Metro Manila from 1975 until 1990 when it was replaced by the Metro Manila Authority. The MMA itself would later be known as the Metropolitan Manila Development Authority (MMDA).

Currently, Metro Manila has no central executive head with the MMDA, headed by a chairperson, serves as the advisory body for the local government units of the national capital region.

History
Then President Ferdinand Marcos established the Metro Manila Commission (MMC) to act as the central government of the local government units (LGUs) of the National Capital Region (NCR) or Metro Manila. The head of the commission was a governor, an appointive position rather than an elected one. Marcos appointed his wife Imelda Marcos as the MMC Governor.

Following the People Power Revolution of 1986, President Marcos was removed from his position with Corazon Aquino installed as new president. Marcos' whole family went into exile. The succeeding holders of the position of MMC Governor served in care-taker capacity as Officers-in-Charge (OIC; or Acting MMC Governors) while Aquino evaluated on the possible fate of the MMC. Aquino appointed Joey Lina as acting Governor within the year. In 1987, Lina resigned to run for senator and acting Makati Mayor Jejomar Binay was appointed in Lina's place. Binay himself later resigned from his post as Governor to run for Mayor of Makati.

Presidential Management Staff Elfren Cruz was appointed following Binay's resignation. Cruz served the post until the abolition of the MMC, consequentially the governor post itself, in 1990. The MMC was replaced by the Metro Manila Authority which would be led by one of the Mayors of Metro Manila as MMA Chairperson.

Proposed revival
There are proposals since 2017 to revive the position of Governor of Metro Manila due to concerns about the limited power of the Metropolitan Manila Development Authority as a body, and its head the MMDA Chairman.

House Bill 2596 (previously 4758) titled An Act Creating The Metropolitan Manila Government was among the measures seeking to do so. The measure, authored by representative Lito Atienza of Buhay Party-List, seeks the establishment of a regional government for Metro Manila to be led by a governor elected by voters in the metropolis. The government will absorb all the powers of the MMDA, which according to Atienza is just a coordinating agency whose chairperson could be defied by Metro Manila's mayors. As per the measure the governor will be assisted by a vice governor and a regional council, where each congressional district has one representative. Then MMDA Chairman Tim Orbos also supported proposals to revive the position since the MMDA chairman has no powers to enact ordinance that would cover all LGUs of Metro Manila.

List of Governors

See also
Chairperson of the Metropolitan Manila Development Authority
List of mayors of Metro Manila

References

Metro Manila
Metro Manila
Defunct government positions in the Philippines